Laila Abdullah Al-Faid (born 8 January 1996) is a Lebanese actress living in Kuwait, she is known for her roles in TV series broadcast in Gulf region.

Life
Laila Abdallah was born in Kuwait to Lebanese parents. She begun her career as model in music videos, her first role was in Saher Al-lail in 2010, her younger sister Shahad Abdallah (born in 1999) is also an actress. In December 2017 she is married to Iranian actor Abdallah Abas, but they divorced after couple months in 2018.

Works

TV Series
 Night vigil (2010)
 Shar elnofous 3 (2010)
 Tu Nahar (2010)
 Zenat Alhayat (2011)
 Solution door (2011)
 Lahfat Alkhater (2011)
 Victory pain (2011)
 Teach me how I forget you (2012)
 I be or not (2012)
 House stranger (2012)
 University girls (2012)
 Kennat Alsham wa kanayen alshameya (2012)
 Leaving lover (2012)
 Moon neighbour (2013)
 Sel Alhawa (2013)
 I will see you good (2014)
 Alwajeha (2014)
 Maskanak yofi (2014)
 High heel (2014)
 Kasel Alkhawater (2014)
 Uncle Saqer (2015)
 In her eyes song (2015)
 Girl and Old man (2015)
 Zero hour (2016)
 After The end (2016)
 Grenade (2017)
 Mamnou Alweqof (2017)
 Ham Alnawaya (2018)
 Alkhafi aatham (2018)
 The street crossing (2018)
 Agenda (2019)
 Thorn hugging (2019)

Stage
 Love Story (2011)
 Alghoul (2011)
 Home dreams (2012)
 The magician castle (2012)
 Cacau factory (2013)
 Newspapers seller (2014)
 Ghosts screaming (2015)
 Khamis kemash khashem habash (2015)
 Roman bath (2016)
 Kids area (2017)
 Tomorrow (2018)
 Friends of clouds (2019)

Movies
 090 (2014)
 6 Apartment (2015)
 Baby (2016)
 Young and old men (2018)

Hosting
 Tarek show (2014)
 Inzel boshinki (2019)

References

External links
  Layla Abdullah on IMDb

1996 births
Living people
21st-century Lebanese actresses
Lebanese film actresses
Lebanese television actresses
Lebanese stage actresses
Lebanese emigrants to Kuwait